Timothy Pilsbury (April 12, 1789 – November 23, 1858) was a United States representative from Texas. He was born in Newburyport, Massachusetts where he attended the common schools. He was employed in a store for about two years before he became a sailor. During the War of 1812, he commanded the privateer Yankee. After the war, he engaged in shipping and settled in Eastport, Maine.

Pilsbury served as a member of the Maine House of Representatives in 1825 and 1826 and a member of the executive council 1827–1836. He was an unsuccessful candidate for election in 1836 to the Twenty-fifth Congress. He moved to Ohio and thence to New Orleans, Louisiana and later to Brazoria, Texas.

Pilsbury was a member of the House of Representatives of the Republic of Texas in 1840 and 1841 and served in the Senate of that Republic in 1842. He was also the chief justice of the county court and judge of probate for Brazoria County, Texas. He was again a member of the Texas Senate in 1845.

Upon the admission of Texas as a State into the Union, he was elected as a Democrat to the Twenty-ninth and Thirtieth Congresses and served from March 30, 1846, to March 3, 1849. Pilsbury was an unsuccessful candidate for reelection in 1848 to the Thirty-first Congress. He died in Henderson, Texas in 1858 and was buried in the City Cemetery.

References

1789 births
1858 deaths
American people of the War of 1812
Politicians from Newburyport, Massachusetts
People from Eastport, Maine
Democratic Party members of the Maine House of Representatives
Democratic Party members of the Texas House of Representatives
Democratic Party members of the United States House of Representatives from Texas
19th-century American politicians